Richard Allen Landes (born June 26, 1949) is an American historian and author who specializes in medieval millennial thinking. Until 2015 he taught at Boston University, and then began working at Bar-Ilan University, where his current interests include defending the politics of Israel in the light of what he calls media manipulation by Palestinians.

Biography
Landes is the son of the late American-Jewish Harvard Professor of Economics and History David Landes. His early publications were concerned with hagiography; his first published monograph was a translation of the vita of Saint Martial; his second on the scribe and forger Adémar de Chabannes. Until 2015 he was a professor in the Department of History at Boston University, and the director of Boston University's Center for Millennial Studies. Since 2015, he is a Senior Fellow at the Center for International Communication at Bar-Ilan University, in Ramat Gan, Israel.

Academic work
Landes specializes in millennial thinking in the Middle Ages, particularly around the year 1000. In 2000, Landes published what was said to be the first encyclopedia on the topic of millennial movements in Europe, the Encyclopedia of Millennialism and Millennial Movements. Landes also published "Celebrating Orientalism" wherein he argues that the Palestinian critic Edward Said and Arabs in general do not like to be orientalized because of honour-shame culture.

In "Orientalism, a Thousand and One Times" and "Warientalism, or the Carrier of Firewood," Landes' discourse is labelled Warientalist, a concept that refers to a discourse defined by power and sentiment rather than knowledge.

Israel and "Pallywood"

Landes coined the term Pallywood ("Palestinian Hollywood"), described by Ruthie Blum as referring to "productions staged by the Palestinians, in front of (and often with cooperation from) Western camera crews, for the purpose of promoting anti-Israel propaganda by disguising it as news."

Books

Monographs

Edited books, collections

References

1949 births
Living people
Boston University faculty
Scholars of antisemitism
American historians
Jewish American historians
21st-century American Jews